The NBA Global Games are a series of games featuring NBA teams that are played outside the United States and Canada. Its purpose is to bring teams from the National Basketball Association (NBA) to play games against either another NBA team or a foreign club.

The games themselves are played under NBA rules, which differ slightly from the FIBA rules under which the foreign teams normally play. Court markings and dimensions also differ slightly.

History
The first official overseas game featuring an NBA team was an exhibition matchup between the Washington Bullets and Maccabi Tel Aviv on 7 September 1978. The then-defending champions lost 98–97 at the Yad Eliyahu Arena in Tel Aviv, Israel. The Bullets would play three more exhibition games the following year in Beijing and Shanghai in China, and in Quezon City in the Philippines.

In 1984, a series of exhibition matches pitting the New Jersey Nets, Phoenix Suns and Seattle SuperSonics against local European clubs were held in Israel, Italy, West Germany and Switzerland. Then in 1988, the Atlanta Hawks played against the Soviet Union national basketball team in a three-game series in Tbilisi, Vilnius and Moscow, becoming the first NBA team to play in the Soviet Union.

In 1987, the McDonald's Championship was introduced. While the first edition was held in Milwaukee, the following editions of the event were held in Europe, with the NBA teams emerging victorious against their European counterparts in each staging. The McDonald's Championship was discontinued in 1999.

The first regular season NBA games outside North America were held in Tokyo, Japan in 1990, with the Phoenix Suns and the Utah Jazz splitting the two-game series. Since then four other editions of the NBA Japan Games were held, with the last games being played in Saitama in 2003.

In 1991, the Miami Heat and the Washington Bullets played a preseason game in Nassau, Bahamas, marking the first NBA preseason game in the Caribbean. The following year, the Houston Rockets and the Dallas Mavericks played a preseason game in Mexico City, in the first NBA game held in Latin America. Several other preseason matches would follow in the Dominican Republic and Puerto Rico (under the name NBA Challenge), but it was not until 1997 that the NBA decided to hold its first regular season game in Latin America, featuring the Mavericks and the Rockets in Mexico City.

While the NBA has had a history of sending teams to Europe to play against the local clubs, it was not until 1993 that the league decided to send two of its teams to Europe to play a pair of preseason matches against each other. An exhibition series between the Orlando Magic and the Atlanta Hawks was held in London, United Kingdom, a precursor of what would later be called the NBA Europe Live Tour. Further games were held in Italy, France, Germany, Russia, Spain and Turkey. It was not until 2011, however, that a regular season matchup was first played in Europe. The first regular season games in London pitted the New Jersey Nets against the Toronto Raptors, with the Nets sweeping the two-game series.

In 2004, the NBA held a pair of preseason games in Shanghai and Beijing, as part of the NBA China Games. The two-game series between the Sacramento Kings and the Houston Rockets also marked the homecoming of sorts for Yao Ming, who as the top overall pick of the 2002 NBA draft and a perennial all-star, helped popularize the NBA in China. The China Games eventually became a regular in the NBA's preseason schedule.

In 2013, the NBA decided to unify its overseas tours under one banner: the "NBA Global Games". The newly renamed event witnessed the first NBA preseason game held in Southeast Asia, with the Indiana Pacers and the Houston Rockets facing each other in the Philippines. In addition, a preseason game between the Washington Wizards and the Chicago Bulls in Brazil marked the first NBA preseason match in South America. The league was scheduled to hold a pair of regular season matches in Mexico and United Kingdom, but the game in Mexico City between the San Antonio Spurs and the Minnesota Timberwolves on December 4 never started due to a generator malfunction inside the Mexico City Arena, and was postponed to 8 April 2014 at the Target Centre in Minneapolis.

The 2014 NBA Global Games began in October with two San Antonio Spurs friendlies versus EuroLeague teams Alba Berlin and Fenerbahçe Ülker at Berlin and Istanbul respectively. The Cleveland Cavaliers and Miami Heat played a preseason game at the HSBC Arena in Rio de Janeiro. Then the Brooklyn Nets and Sacramento Kings played two matches at the Mercedes-Benz Arena in Shanghai and the MasterCard Center in Beijing. Like the previous season, two regular season Global Games were scheduled in Mexico City and London; the Mexico City game between the Timberwolves and the Rockets on 12 November was played without incident.

For the 2015–16 season, the NBA scheduled two regular season games to be played outside the United States and Canada. The first game, between the Boston Celtics and the Sacramento Kings, was scheduled to be played on 3 December 2015 at the Mexico City Arena; the Celtics defeated the Kings 114–97. It marked the NBA's third regular-season game in Mexico City. The second game, between the Orlando Magic and the Toronto Raptors, was played on 14 January 2016, at The O2 Arena in London. It marked the NBA's sixth regular-season game in London.

Following years of hiatus due to the COVID-19 pandemic, the NBA Global Games returned for the 2022–23 season with two regular season matchups. The NBA Mexico City Game 2022 will see the Heat face the Spurs on December 17, 2022, at the Mexico City Arena  in Mexico City.  The NBA Paris Game 2023 will feature a matchup between the Chicago Bulls and the Detroit Pistons on January 19, 2023, at the Accor Arena in Paris.

List of preseason games

List of regular season games

See also
 NBA Canada Series
 List of games played between NBA and international teams
 NBA versus EuroLeague games
 McDonald's Championship
 EuroLeague American Tour
 Naismith Cup

References

External links
 Official NBA Global website
 All-time NBA Global Games results

 

 
EuroLeague
Recurring sporting events established in 2006
NBA vs FIBA
Basketball competitions in Europe